The Evangelical Presbyterian Church in Spain is a confessional Calvinist and Presbyterian denomination in Spain. It was begun when the Presbyterian Church of Brazil sent missionaries in Huelva. The work spread to various cities of Spain. It has congregations in Don Benito, Sevilla, Getafe, Torrelodones, Madrid, A Coruña and Málaga plus the first work in Huelva.

The church adheres to the Westminster Confession. The denomination adheres to the five solas, Sola Scriptura, Sola Fide, Sola Gratia, Solus Christus, Soli Deo Gloria.
In 1999, the church was registered by the government.

See also 
 Protestantism in Spain
 Anglicanism in Spain
 Federation of Evangelical Religious Entities of Spain
 Reformed Churches in Spain
 Spanish Evangelical Church
 Spanish Evangelical Lutheran Church
 Union of Evangelical Baptists of Spain

References

External links
 Facebook page
 Church in Huelva
 Church in Don Benito
 Church in Getafe
 Church in Torrelodones
 Church in Málaga

Presbyterian denominations in Europe
Evangelicalism in Spain